James Burn (born 31 July 1849, date of death unknown) was an Australian cricketer. He played one first-class match for Tasmania in 1868.

See also
 List of Tasmanian representative cricketers

References

External links
 

1849 births
Year of death missing
Australian cricketers
Tasmania cricketers
Cricketers from Hobart